Divine Madness is an album by American singer Bette Midler and the Harlettes, released in 1980. It is a live recording taken from Midler's Divine Madness concert film, released the same year. The album, however, does not contain any of Midler's comedy routines and features only her musical performances from the show and it in fact only provides half of the songs that appear in the film. The original live recordings were also to a large extent edited and re-recorded in the studio for the soundtrack album.

Among the tracks included are "Big Noise From Winnetka", from Midler's disco album Thighs and Whispers, repertoire standards like "Shiver Me Timbers", "Chapel of Love", "Leader of The Pack" and "Boogie Woogie Bugle Boy" along with two tracks from her movie The Rose, "Stay With Me" and "Fire Down Below" (not originally included on the soundtrack) released earlier in 1980 and the Divine Madness album closes with renditions of rock classics like Bruce Springsteen's "E Street Shuffle", The Rolling Stones' "You Can't Always Get What You Want" and Bob Dylan's "I Shall Be Released".

The final film excluded "My Mother's Eyes," despite it being released as a single, and "Shiver Me Timbers" was not featured in the home video release (VHS or DVD).  Footage of these songs have not been restored.

The soundtrack does not include "Do You Want to Dance?," "Ready to Begin Again," "My Way," "To the South Seas/Hawaiian War Chant," "Ebb Tide," "The Rose," or any monologues.

The Divine Madness album like the movie itself was a moderate commercial success, peaking at #34 on Billboards album chart.

The album was released on CD for the first time in 1989. A remastered version of the album was released by Atlantic Records/Warner Music in 1995.

Track listingSide A"Big Noise From Winnetka" (Gil Rodin, Bob Crosby, Bob Haggart, Ray Bauduc) - 3:52
"Paradise" (Harry Nilsson, Gil Garfield, Perry Botkin Jr.) - 4:09
"Shiver Me Timbers" (Tom Waits) - 3:56
"Fire Down Below" (Bob Seger) - 3:05
"Stay With Me" (Jerry Ragovoy, George Weiss) - 6:24Side B'  
"My Mother's Eyes" (Tom Jans) - 2:29
"Chapel of Love" / "Boogie Woogie Bugle Boy" (Jeff Barry, Ellie Greenwich, Phil Spector) / (Don Raye, Hughie Prince) - 4:02
"E Street Shuffle" / "Summer (The First Time)" / "Leader of the Pack"  (Bruce Springsteen) / (Bobby Goldsboro) / (George Morton, Jeff Barry, Ellie Greenwich) - 9:42
"You Can't Always Get What You Want" / "I Shall Be Released" (Mick Jagger, Keith Richards) / (Bob Dylan) - 5:56

Personnel
 Bette Midler - lead vocals
 Tony Berg - guitar, background vocals
 Jon Bonine - trombone, background vocals
 Joey Carbone - keyboards, background vocals
 Rich Cooper - trumpet
 David Luell - saxophone
 John Pierce - bass guitar
 David Shank - percussion
 Chas Sanford - lead guitar
 Art Wood - drums
 Michael Boddicker - synthesizers
 Randy Kerber - keyboards, background vocals
 Jocelyn Brown - background vocals
 Ula Hedwig - background vocals
 Diva Gray - background vocals
 Katey Sagal - background vocals
 Luther Vandross - background vocals

Production
 Dennis Kirk - record producer, sound engineer
 Tony Berg - musical arranger & supervisor
 Randy Kerber - musical arranger & supervisor
 Mixed at Sunset Sound and Record One
 Remixed at Regent Sound Studios and Atlantic Studios
 Concert Recording: Wally Heider Studios
 Assistant Engineers: Niko Bolas, James Lerner, David Lerner
 Mastered by: Bernie Grundman

Charts

References 

Bette Midler live albums
1980 live albums
Atlantic Records live albums